"On a High" is a song written and recorded by singer-songwriter Duncan Sheik and released as the first single from his album Daylight.

A female cover of "On a High" can be heard in the commercials for the TV movie Queen Sized, sung by Nikki Blonsky.

The song was also featured on an episode of Laguna Beach: The Real Orange County.

Track listing

US radio promo
 "On a High" (Album Version)

German commercial single
 "On a High" (Single Version)
 "On a High" (Jamie Myerson Remix Edit)
 "On a High" (Gabriel & Dresden's Love From Humboldt Edit)

Chart performance

References

2003 singles
Duncan Sheik songs
2002 songs
Songs about drugs
Songs written by Duncan Sheik